Yrjö Vuolio (8 December 1888 – 2 September 1948) was a Finnish gymnast. He competed in the men's artistic individual all-around event at the 1912 Summer Olympics.

References

1888 births
1948 deaths
Finnish male artistic gymnasts
Olympic gymnasts of Finland
Gymnasts at the 1912 Summer Olympics
Gymnasts from Tampere
20th-century Finnish people